Robert I. Berdon (December 24, 1929 – October 31, 2019) was a justice of the Connecticut Supreme Court from September 4, 1991 to 1999.

Education and career
Berdon earned both his undergraduate and an LL.B. degree from the University of Connecticut, graduating from the University of Connecticut law school in 1957. Berdon worked for sixteen years in private practice before entering his political career.

In 1970, Berdon ran for and was elected Connecticut State Treasurer. He received national attention during his tenure, first in 1972 when refused to give up his office space at the Capitol, even when an eviction notice was served. Another significant feat during Berdon's tenure occurred when Connecticut won a seat on the PBW Stock Exchange in Philadelphia, "becoming the first public body to gain membership on a stock exchange."

In 1973, he was appointed to the Connecticut Superior Court, and after being passed over for the position by Governor William A. O'Neill following a controversial 1981 ruling requiring the state to pay for abortions for poor women, in 1991 he was elevated to the Connecticut Supreme Court by Governor Lowell Weicker. Berdon stepped down in 1999 after reaching the mandatory retirement age, but continued working as a state trial referee until 2014.

Berdon was married until the death of his wife in 1992. Berdon died in 2019.

References

Justices of the Connecticut Supreme Court
1929 births
2019 deaths
University of Connecticut School of Law alumni
20th-century American judges